Metodija Bešliovski (born August 19, 1996) is a Macedonian professional basketball Small forward who currently plays for Kožuv in the Macedonian First League.

References

External links
 at Eurobasket.com
 at Balkanleague.net

1996 births
Sportspeople from Skopje
Macedonian men's basketball players
Living people
Small forwards